Khalan (also Romanized as Khālān) is a village in Seyyedan Rural District, Abish Ahmad District, Kaleybar County, East Azerbaijan Province, Iran. At the 2006 census, its population was 602, in 123 families.

References 

Populated places in Kaleybar County